Carlos González may refer to:

Politics
Carlos González (American politician), American politician from Massachusetts
Carlos Hank González (1927–2001), Mexican politician and businessman
Carlos Joaquín González (born 1965), Mexican politician
Carlos Zatarain González (born 1961), Mexican politician

Sports

Football
Carlos Gonzales (born 1989), Peruvian football forward
Carlos González (footballer, born 1935), Mexican football forward
Carlos González (footballer, born 1973), Mexican football midfielder
Carlos González (footballer, born 1976), Paraguayan football midfielder
Carlos González (footballer, born 1977), Mexican football defender and manager
Carlos González (footballer, born 1986), Paraguayan football striker
Carlos González (football manager) (born 1986), Spanish football manager
Carlos González (footballer, born 1993), Paraguayan football forward
Carlos González (footballer, born 1997), Spanish football midfielder
Carlos González (footballer, born 1960), Chilean football manager and former player

Other sports
Carlos González (basketball) (born 1930), Uruguayan
Carlos González (swimmer) (born 1955), Panamanian Olympic swimmer
Carlos González (boxer, born 1959), Mexican featherweight
Carlos González (boxer, born 1972), Mexican welterweight
Carlos González (baseball) (born 1985), from Venezuela

Other
Carlos Hank González (businessman, born 1971), Mexican businessman and banker
Carlos González (cinematographer), American cinematographer and director
Carlos Bernardo González Pecotche (1901–1963), Argentine humanist and thinker
Carlos Canseco González (1921–2009), Mexican physician and philanthropist
Carlos González Cruchaga (1921–2008), Chilean bishop
Carlos González Nova (1917–2009), Mexican businessman

See also
Estadio Carlos González, or Estadio Banorte, a stadium in Sinaloa, Mexico